Patrol Base Shamshad is a foreign military base in Helmand Province, Afghanistan.

Both Estonian and British troops have occupied the base. The base has been used to train Afghan soldiers.

Units

The following units have been posted here at some point:
 'A' Squadron of the 1st The Queen's Dragoon Guards under Operation Herrick IX between October 2008 and April 2009.
 Company C, Expeditionary Estonian Task Force during November 2009.
 2nd Brigade Platoon, 2nd Air Naval Gunfire Liaison Company, Marine Expeditionary Brigade-Afghanistan during November 2009.

References

Military installations of Afghanistan
Military bases of the United Kingdom in Afghanistan
Military installations of Estonia
Bases